Edoardo Giorgetti (born 5 February 1989) is an Italian breaststroke swimmer.

In 2006, Giorgetti was Junior World Champion in 100 m and 200 m breaststroke, and in 4×100 m medley relay.

In 2007, Giorgetti was Junior European Champion in 200 m breaststroke and won the silver medal in 100 m of the same stroke behind Dániel Gyurta. He also represented Italy at the 2007 World Aquatics Championships swimming 100 m breaststroke.

In 2008, Giorgetti set the new short course European record for 200 m breaststroke in 2:05.02.

See also
 2006 FINA Youth World Swimming Championships
 2007 European Junior Swimming Championships

External links
 Edoardo Giorgetti on FIN's website 

1989 births
Sportspeople from the Province of Pesaro and Urbino
Living people
Mediterranean Games silver medalists for Italy
Mediterranean Games medalists in swimming
Swimmers at the 2009 Mediterranean Games
Universiade bronze medalists for Italy
Universiade medalists in swimming
Swimmers at the 2018 Mediterranean Games
Medalists at the 2013 Summer Universiade
Italian male breaststroke swimmers
21st-century Italian people